John Crowley  (born December 1, 1942) is an American author of fantasy, science fiction and historical fiction. He has also written essays. Crowley studied at Indiana University and has a second career as a documentary film writer.

Crowley is best known as the author of Little, Big (1981), a work which received World Fantasy Award for Best Novel and has been called "a neglected masterpiece" by Harold Bloom, and his Ægypt series of novels which revolve around the same themes of Hermeticism, memory, families and religion. Some of his nonfiction writing has appeared bimonthly in Harper's Magazine in the form of his "Easy Chair" column, which ended in 2016.

Biography 
John Crowley was born in Presque Isle, Maine, in 1942; his father was then an officer in the US Army Air Corps. He grew up in Vermont, northeastern Kentucky and (for the longest stretch) Indiana, where he went to high school and college. He moved to New York City after college to make movies, and did find work in documentary films, an occupation he still pursues. He published his first novel (The Deep) in 1975, and his twelfth (Ka: Dar Oakley in the Ruin of Ymr) in 2017. Since 1993 he has taught creative writing at Yale University. In 1992 he received the Award in Literature from the American Academy and Institute of Arts and Letters.

His first published novels were science fiction: The Deep (1975) and Beasts (1976). Engine Summer (1979) was nominated for the 1980 American Book Award in a one-year category Science Fiction;
it appears in David Pringle's Science Fiction: The 100 Best Novels.  In 1981 came Little, Big, covered in Pringle's sequel, Modern Fantasy: The 100 Best Novels.

In 1987 Crowley embarked on an ambitious four-volume novel, Ægypt, comprising The Solitudes (originally published as Ægypt), Love & Sleep,  Dæmonomania, and Endless Things, published in May 2007. This series and Little, Big were cited when Crowley received the prestigious American Academy of Arts and Letters Award for Literature.

He is also the recipient of an Ingram Merrill Foundation grant. James Merrill, the organization's founder, greatly loved Little, Big, and was blurbed praising Crowley on the first edition of Love & Sleep. His recent novels are The Translator, recipient of the Premio Flaiano (Italy); Lord Byron’s Novel: The Evening Land, which contains an entire imaginary novel by the poet; and the aforementioned Four Freedoms, about workers at an Oklahoma defense plant during World War II. A novella, The Girlhood of Shakespeare's Heroines, appeared in 2002.  A museum-quality 25th anniversary edition of Little, Big, featuring the art of Peter Milton and a critical introduction by Harold Bloom, is in preparation.

Crowley's short fiction is collected in three volumes: Novelty (containing the World Fantasy Award-winning novella Great Work of Time), Antiquities, and Novelties & Souvenirs, an omnibus volume containing nearly all his short fiction through its publication in 2004. A collection of essays and reviews entitled In Other Words was published in early 2007.

Most of the ideas he has for books occur about ten years before he actually starts working on the books.

In 1989 Crowley and his wife Laurie Block founded Straight Ahead Pictures to produce media (film, video, radio and internet) on American history and culture. Crowley has written scripts for short films and documentaries, many historical documentaries for public television; his work has received numerous awards and has been shown at the New York Film Festival, the Berlin Film Festival, and many others. His scripts include The World of Tomorrow (on the 1939 World's Fair), No Place to Hide (on the bomb shelter obsession), The Hindenburg (for HBO), and FIT: Episodes in the History of the Body (American fitness practices and beliefs over the decades; with Laurie Block).

Crowley's correspondence with literary critic Harold Bloom, and their mutual appreciation, led in 1993 to Crowley taking up a post at Yale University, where he teaches courses in Utopian fiction, fiction writing, and screenplay writing.  Bloom claimed on Contentville.com that Little, Big ranks among the five best novels by a living writer, and included Little, Big, Ægypt (The Solitudes), and Love & Sleep in his canon of literature (in the appendix to The Western Canon, 1994). In his Preface to Snake's-Hands, Bloom identifies Crowley as his "favorite contemporary writer", and the Ægypt series as his "favorite romance...after Little, Big".

Crowley has also taught at the Clarion West Writers' Workshop held annually in Seattle, Washington.

Awards 
 1982: Little, Big received the World Fantasy Award for Best Novel and the Mythopoeic Fantasy Award
 1990: Great Work of Time received the World Fantasy Award for Best Novella
 1992: American Academy and Institute of Arts and Letters Award in Literature
 1997: Gone received the Locus Award for Best Short Story
 1999: "La Grande oeuvre du temps", the French language edition of "Great Work of Time" (translated by Monique LeBailly), won the Grand Prix de l'Imaginaire, Nouvelle étrangère (Grand Prize for translated story)
 2003: The Translator received the Italian Premio Flaiano
 2006: World Fantasy Award for Life Achievement
 2007: Bulgakov Award of Portal SF Assembly (Kyiv, Ukraine)
 2018: "Spring Break" received the Edgar Award
 2018: Ka: Dar Oakley in the Ruin of Ymr received the Mythopoeic Fantasy Award 
 2021: Kra, Dar Duchesne dans les ruines de l’Ymr, the French language edition of Ka: Dar Oakley in the Ruin of Ymr, received the Grand Prix de l'Imaginaire for Foreign Novel

Bibliography

Novels 
 The Deep, Doubleday (1975), illustrated by John Cayea, and Anne Yvonne Gilbert in 1984
 Beasts, Doubleday (1976), illustrated by John Cayea, and Anne Yvonne Gilbert in 1983
 Engine Summer, Doubleday (1979) — John W. Campbell Memorial Award runner-up, American Book Award and BSFA Award finalist, 1980, illustrated by Gary Friedman, and Anne Yvonne Gilbert in 1983
 Little, Big, Bantam (1981) — 1982 World Fantasy Award and Mythopoeic Award winner; Locus runner-up; BSFA, Hugo, and Nebula nominee, illustrated by Anne Yvonne Gilbert in 1983
 The Translator, William Morrow (2002)
 Lord Byron's Novel: The Evening Land, William Morrow (2005)
 Four Freedoms, William Morrow (2009)
 The Chemical Wedding: by Christian Rosencreutz: A Romance in Eight Days by Johann Valentin Andreae in a New Version, Small Beer Press (2016)
 Ka: Dar Oakley in the Ruin of Ymr, Saga Press (2017) — Mythopoeic Award winner; World Fantasy Award nominee
 Flint and Mirror: A Novel of History and Magic, Tor Books (2022)

The Ægypt Cycle
 Ægypt, Bantam (1987); revised and republished 2007 under intended original title, The Solitudes — 1988 World Fantasy Award and Arthur C. Clarke Award nominee
 Love & Sleep, Bantam (1994); revised 2008 — 1995 WFA nominee
 Dæmonomania, Bantam (2000); revised 2008
 Endless Things, Small Beer Press (2007); revised 2009 — 2008 Locus Award fifth place

Note
Crowley's short story "Flint and Mirror" (2018) was presented as "recently discovered among uncatalogued papers of the novelist Fellowes Kraft" (one of the Ægypt'''s protagonists). He expanded the story into a 2022 novel of the same name, though the link to Ægypt was omitted.

 Short fiction 
 "Antiquities" (1977, in Whispers: An Anthology of Fantasy and Horror)
 "Somewhere to Elsewhere" (1978 but printed as 1977, in The Little Magazine; an earlier draft of part of the first chapter and all of the second chapter of Little, Big)
 "Where Spirits Gat Them Home" (1978, in Shadows anthology; later revised as "Her Bounty to the Dead")
 "The Single Excursion of Caspar Last" (1979, in Gallery magazine; later incorporated into "Great Work of Time")
 "The Reason for the Visit" (1980, in Interfaces anthology)
 "The Green Child" (1981, in Elsewhere anthology)
 "Novelty" (1983, in Interzone magazine)
 "Snow" (1985, in Omni magazine) — 1985 Locus Award third place
 "The Nightingale Sings at Night" (1989, in Novelty)
 "Great Work of Time" (novella, 1989, in Novelty), Bantam (1991) — 1990 World Fantasy Award and 1999 Grand Prix de l'Imaginaire winner
 "In Blue" (novella, 1989, in Novelty)
 "Missolonghi 1824" (1990, in Isaac Asimov's Science Fiction Magazine)
 "Exogamy" (1993, in Omni Best Science Fiction Three anthology)
 "Gone" (1996, in The Magazine of Fantasy & Science Fiction) — 1997 Locus Award winner
 "Lost and Abandoned" (1997, in Black Swan, White Raven anthology)
 "An Earthly Mother Sits and Sings" (2000, published as an original chapbook by Dreamhaven Press, illustrated by Charles Vess; included into Flint and Mirror)
 "The War Between the Objects and the Subjects" (2002, in J. K. Potter's Embrace the Mutation anthology)
 "The Girlhood of Shakespeare's Heroines" (novella, 2002, in Conjunctions: 39, The New Wave Fabulists, edited by Peter Straub), Subterranean Press (2005)
 "Little Yeses, Little Nos" (2005, in The Yale Review)
 "Conversation Hearts" (2008; published as a chapbook by Subterranean Press)
 "And Go Like This" (2011, in Naked City anthology)
 "Tom Mix" (vignette, 2012, online; republished as "In the Tom Mix Museum")
 "Glow Little Glowworm" (2012, in Conjunctions: 59, Colloquy)
 "The Million Monkeys of M. Borel" (2016, in Conjunctions: 67, Other Aliens)
 "This Is Our Town" (2017, in Totalitopia)
 "Mount Auburn Street" (2017, in The Yale Review)
 "Spring Break" (2017, in New Haven Noir anthology) — 2018 Edgar Award winner
 "Flint and Mirror" (2018, in The Book of Magic anthology; expanded into a novel of the same name)
 "Anosognosia" (2019, in And Go Like This)
 "Poker Night at the Elks Club 1938" (2022, in Conjunctions: 79, Onword)

Collections
 Novelty, Bantam (1989); collects "The Nightingale Sings At Night", "Great Work of Time", "In Blue" and the previously published "Novelty".
 Antiquities: Seven Stories, Incunabula (1993); collects all of his stories to that point which were not included in Novelty.
 Novelties and Souvenirs: Collected Short Fiction, Perennial (2004); collects all of his short fiction up to that point, with the exception of "The Girlhood of Shakespeare's Heroines".
 Totalitopia, PM Press (2017); collects four stories ("This Is Our Town", "Gone", "In the Tom Mix Museum", "And Go Like This"), three essays and the interview.And Go Like This: Stories, Small Beer Press (2019); collects all of his short fiction from 2002-2019.

 Omnibuses 
 Beasts/Engine Summer/Little Big, QPBC (1991)
 Three Novels (1994; later published as Otherwise: Three Novels by John Crowley. It includes The Deep, Beasts, Engine Summer).

 Documentary scripts
 America Lost and Found (1979)
 Hindenberg: Ship of Doom (1980)
 No Place to Hide (1983; 30 min)
 America and Lewis Hine (1984, with Laurie Block and Daniel Allentuck; 60 min)
 The World of Tomorrow (1984; 76 min)
 Are We Winning Mommy? America and the Cold War (1986, with Laurie Block; 87 min)
 A $10 Horse and a $40 Saddle (1987)
 Fit: Episodes in the History of the Body (1991, with Laurie Block; 74 min)
 Pearl Harbor: Surprise and Remembrance (1991)
 Liberators: Fighting on Two Fronts in World War II (1992; 90 min)
 Nobody's Girls: Five Women of the West (1995; 90 min)
 Morning Sun (2003, written with Carma Hinton and Geremie Barmé; 117 min)

 Nonfiction 
 Essay collections 
 In Other Words, Subterranean Press (2007)
 Reading Backwards: Essays & Reviews, 2005-2018, Subterranean Press (2019)

 Articles 
Crowley's articles and essay-reviews have appeared in Lapham's Quarterly, the Boston Review, Tin House, and Harper's. 

 Audio books 
 Ægypt, Blackstone Audiobooks (2007; unabridged reading of The Solitudes by the author.)
 Little, Big, Blackstone Audiobooks (2011; unabridged reading by the author.)
 Ka: Dar Oakley in the Ruin of Ymr, Brilliance Audio (2017; unabridged reading by the author.)

 References 

Further reading
 Snake's-Hands: The Fiction of John Crowley'', edited by Alice K. Turner and Michael Andre-Driussi, Cosmos (Canton, OH), 2003.

External links 

 

 
John Crowley Collection at the Harry Ransom Center at the University of Texas at Austin

1942 births
Living people
20th-century American male writers
20th-century American novelists
20th-century American short story writers
21st-century American male writers
21st-century American novelists
21st-century American short story writers
American fantasy writers
American male novelists
American male short story writers
Chapbook writers
Harper's Magazine people
Indiana University Bloomington alumni
Novelists from Maine
People from Presque Isle, Maine
Postmodern writers
World Fantasy Award-winning writers